Ioannis Thomakos (born 14 March 1977) is a Greek water polo player who competed in the 2000 Summer Olympics (10th place), the 2004 Summer Olympics (4th place) and the 2008 Summer Olympics (7th place) with the Greece men's national water polo team. He was part of the national squad that won the silver medal at the 1997 World Cup in Athens. and the Bronze Medal in the 2004 World League in Long Beach.

Thomakos started his career at Panionios and in 1997 he moved to Olympiacos where he played for nine consecutive seasons (1997–2006), winning 17 major titles (1 LEN Champions League, 1 LEN Super Cup, 7 Greek Championships, 6 Greek Cups and 2 Greek Super Cups).

Thomakos was a key player in Olympiacos' 2002 Quardruple (LEN Champions League, LEN Super Cup, Greek Championship, Greek Cup all in 2002), scoring a spectacular long-distance goal in the 2002 LEN Champions League final win (9–7) against Honvéd in Budapest.

Honours

Club
Olympiacos
 LEN Champions League: 2001–02 ; runners-up: 2000–01
 LEN Super Cup: 2002
 LEN Euro Cup runners-up: 1997–98, 1998–99
 Greek Championship: 1998–99, 1999–00, 2000–01, 2001–02, 2002–03, 2003–04, 2004–05
 Greek Cup: 1997–98, 2000–01, 2001–02, 2002–03, 2003–04, 2005–06
 Greek Super Cup: 1997, 1998
Panionios
LEN Euro Cup runners-up: 2008–09

National team
  Silver Medal in 1997 World Cup, Athens
  Bronze Medal in 2004 World League, Long Beach
 4th place in 2004 Olympic Games, Athens
 4th place in 2003 World Championship, Barcelona

Awards
 Greek Championship Top scorer:  2007–2008 with Panionios

See also
 Greece men's Olympic water polo team records and statistics

References

External links
 

1977 births
Living people
Greek male water polo players
Olympiacos Water Polo Club players
Olympic water polo players of Greece
Water polo players at the 2000 Summer Olympics
Water polo players at the 2004 Summer Olympics
Water polo players at the 2008 Summer Olympics
Water polo players from Athens